Dignitas (formerly Team Dignitas) is a professional esports organization based in Newark, New Jersey, founded by Michael "ODEE" O'Dell on 9 September 2003 as a merger of two top Battlefield 1942 clans. Dignitas was acquired by the Philadelphia 76ers in September 2016. The team is best known for its League of Legends, Rocket League, and Counter-Strike: Global Offensive squads.

In September 2019, Dignitas formed a new parent company, New Meta Entertainment (NME), a digital sports and entertainment company.

The organization rebranded in October 2018, dropping "Team" from its name and replacing its old "alien" logo with an owl logo. In January 2021, Dignitas once again replaced their logo, returning a modernized version of the original "alien" design and introducing it as a mascot named Digi.

Achievements 
Since the organization's inception in 2003, Dignitas have won 18 world championships and competed in 35 different titles.

2003 to 2009 
Dignitas' first world championship came in 2005, when Chris Bullard won the FIFA Interactive World Cup.

In 2006, Dignitas' Battlefield 2 team was chosen as the Team of the Year by Geeksnet.org.

In May 2007, British Counter-Strike 1.6 news website UKCounterTerrorist.com ranked Dignitas as the number one team in Great Britain.

Freek "XeNoGeaR" Molema won the Trackmania Nations tournament and $10,000 at the 2007 Electronic Sports World Cup (ESWC).

August 2007 saw Dignitas' Enemy Territory: Quake Wars team claim victory at Quakecon 2007, taking home $22,000.

Shaun "Apollo" Clark, representing Dignitas, placed first in Command & Conquer 3: Tiberium Wars at the World Cyber Games 2007.

Dignitas' World in Conflict team was nominated for the 2007 eSports Award as "eSport Team of the Year".

At World Cyber Games 2008, Command & Conquer 3: Kane's Wrath player Pascal "Dackel" Pfefferle would win gold for Dignitas.

Esports coverage site Cadred.org chose Dignitas' Counter-Strike: Source team as 2008 Team of the Year, and Sam "RattlesnK" Gawn as Player of the Year.

In 2009, Dignitas' Call of Duty 4 and Team Fortress 2 teams were placed first in Cadred.org's European rankings for three consecutive months.

November 2009 saw Jesper "KarjeN" Karjalainen win the TrackMania Nations Forever tournament at the World Cyber Games.

2010 to Present 
At the 2010 World Cyber Games, David "DaveySkills" Kelly won the Forza Motorsport 3 championship.

In January 2011, Dignitas player Jeffrey "SjoW" Brusi won $7,500 after placing first in the Starcraft 2 IEM European Tournament.

From 2010 until the organization's departure from the scene in 2016, Dignitas housed multiple TrackMania world champions. This began with Fredrik "Bergie" Bergmann's win at ESWC 2010. Then, Tim "Spam" Lunenburg and Carl-Antoni "Carl Jr." Cloutier placed first and third respectively at ESWC 2012 tournament. Most notably, Carl-Antoni "Carl Jr." Cloutier won three consecutive TrackMania 2 Stadium titles at ESWC 2013, 2014, and 2015.

Led by British team captain James "Bakery" Baker, Dignitas finished second at the 2015 Heroes of the Storm World Championship, and went on to win 4 of the 5 European Championships the next year. Continuing on form in 2017, winning the first international competition of the year at IEM Katowice, and taking home another silver medal in the mid-season world championship. In 2018, the team won the first international tournament of the year, making the team three-time IEM Katowice champions..

Dignitas' Rocket League team, consisting of ViolentPanda, Turbopolsa, and Kaydop, won the RLCS Season 5 Finals in June 2018, becoming world champions.

Dignitas' Counter-Strike: Global Offensive women's roster won the annual GIRLGAMER Esports Festival back-to-back in 2017 and 2018, and the Intel Extreme Challenge Katowice in 2018 and 2019.

League of Legends 
After being rejected as a franchise partner for the NA LCS in 2017, Dignitas returned to League of Legends in 2019 by acquiring Clutch Gaming. Under Dignitas' coaching staff, Clutch the team climbed from ninth place at the end of the 2019 LCS Spring Season to qualifying for Worlds 2019 as North America's third seed. After Worlds, Clutch Gaming officially rebranded under the Dignitas banner.

On 3 June 2021, Dignitas announced a naming rights deal with digital bank company "QNTMPAY". Under this four-year partnership, Dignitas' LCS and LCS Academy teams renamed to "Dignitas QNTMPAY" and "DIG QNTM Academy" respectively.

Current rosters

LCS team

Academy team

Rocket League 
Dignitas originally entered the Rocket League competitive scene with the pickup of the amateur North American team "Applesauce" on 23 January 2018.

On 22 May 2018, Dignitas announced that they parted ways with their North American team and signed the roster of Gale Force Esports, the defending Rocket League world champions. In February 2022, Dignitas signed NFL player Boston Scott as a content creator and substitute for their Rocket League roster.

Current roster

Counter-Strike: Global Offensive 
Dignitas has fielded Counter-Strike teams since 2004, but joined the Global Offensive scene on 8 March 2013 with the signing of Torqued. Dignitas dropped this squad on 8 August 2013 and took a brief leave from the scene until 16 February 2014, when they announced their pickup of the Danish team über G33KZ. This roster achieved some notable results, including 3rd-4th-place finishes at both the EMS One Katowice 2014 and ESL One Cologne 2014 majors. This roster would later be transferred to TSM in January 2015.

The day after the TSM transfer, Dignitas announced that they acquired the Danish roster of "Deponeret". This roster would also achieve impressive results, with the most notable being an upset win at EPICENTER 2016. On 19 December 2016, Dignitas mutually parted ways with this second Danish squad as well, stating "Team Dignitas and the Philadelphia 76ers are committed to building our next elite, international Counter Strike: Global Offensive team based in North America."

March 2017 saw Dignitas an international team featuring three former members of FaZe, with the roster disbanding in January 2018 after failing to qualify for the European CS:GO Minor. Later, in February 2018, Dignitas announced a North American roster, but dropped them in August after being relegated from the ESL Pro League.

Finally, in January 2020, Dignitas unveiled the signing of the ex-Ninjas in Pyjamas roster and Håkon "hallzerk" Fjærli.

On 17 August 2020, esports betting company VIE.gg acquired naming rights of Dignitas' Counter-Strike: Global Offensive team, with the team rebranding to "Dignitas VIE" and sporting an alternative red and black version of the Dignitas logo.

Current roster

Valorant 
Dignitas plunged into the Valorant scene with the signing of an all women's team on 15 May 2020. Kiara "milk" Makua left on 13 April 2021, leaving the team with only four members.

Later, the organization also signed free agent roster Homeless on 20 August 2020. Posting middling results, the team was eventually dropped on 31 March 2021.

Current roster

Notes

References

External links 
 

 

2003 establishments in the United Kingdom
Counter-Strike teams
Defunct and inactive fighting game player sponsors
Esports teams based in the United States
Hearthstone teams
Heroes of the Storm teams
League of Legends Championship Series teams
Smite (video game) teams
StarCraft teams
Video gaming in the United Kingdom
World of Tanks teams
Defunct and inactive Dota teams
Team Razer
Philadelphia 76ers
Rocket League teams
Esports teams established in 2003